This is a list of Canadian historical population by province and territory, drawn from the Canadian census of population data and pre-Confederation censuses of Newfoundland and Labrador. Since 1871, Canada has conducted regular national census counts. The data for 1851 to 1976 is drawn primarily from Historical Statistics of Canada, 2nd edition. Data for 1981 through 2021 are from the respective year's respective census. Newfoundland and Labrador pre-Confederation data is from the 1945 Census of Newfoundland and Labrador, volume 1. Data for 1841 and some 1851 data drawn from the 1931 Canadian census. With the exception of Nunavut prior to 1996, the population figures largely reflect modern provincial boundaries; prior to 1996, the population of modern Nunavut is reported with Northwest Territories. Although the census has worked to count First Nations populations since 1871, the it is likely Indigenous Canadians are undercounted by the census. Shaded blocks indicate periods before the province or territory joined the Canadian Confederation. Instances where the reported figure came from a different year's population count (primarily pre-1861 and for Newfoundland) are noted. Total Canadian population row includes the population of Newfoundland and Labrador.

1700 to 1825
Estimates from The Canada Year Book (1867) based on various provincial census records.

1841 to 1931

1941 to 1991

1996 to 2021

Notes

References

Canadian Provinces by Historical Population
Population, Historical
Canada, population, historical